Grovers Mill is an unincorporated community located within West Windsor Township in Mercer County, New Jersey, United States.

History 
On October 30, 1938, the community was made famous in Orson Welles' radio broadcast of The War of the Worlds (drama), where it was depicted as the first landing site of a Martian invasion.

In October 2019, the Historical Society of West Windsor started an online museum exploring the history of West Windsor - including that of Grovers Mill.

In popular culture 

There have been numerous references in fiction, including The Adventures of Buckaroo Banzai Across the 8th Dimension, the Wild Cards book series, and a town called Miller's Grove in The X-Files episode "War of the Coprophages". 

In issue 11 of DC Comics' The Shadow Strikes (1989), The Shadow teams up with a radio announcer named Grover Mills, a character based on the young Orson Welles, who has been impersonating The Shadow on the radio. Welles played the Shadow on radio prior to the War of the Worlds broadcast. An episode of the War of the Worlds TV series takes place in Grovers Mill on the 50th anniversary of the Welles radio drama, and expands on the town's ties to the infamous broadcast. 

Grovers Mill is also a 2006 film shot in Vancouver, British Columbia, Canada. 2018 saw the release of the black comedy audio series Grovers Mill, a true-crime satire about a forensic psychic investigating the moon landing conspiracy.

References

External links
 Mars Attacks! 75 years ago, 'War of the Worlds' broadcast put nation in a panic

The War of the Worlds
West Windsor, New Jersey
Unincorporated communities in Mercer County, New Jersey
Unincorporated communities in New Jersey